Archeognathus is a fossilized jaw apparatus of a large predatory conodont from the Ordovician period (Darriwilian to Sandbian stages). Its large size has made classification difficult, and it has historically been compared to conodonts and gnathostomes (jawed fish) since its remains were first discovered in Missouri. Complete articulated jaw apparatus of Archeognathus primus are common in the Winneshiek Shale lagerstätte of Iowa, allowing its identity as a conodont to be secured.

The jaw apparatus of Archeognathus primus is much more simple than that of most conodonts, with only six elements in its jaw. These include a pair of long, small-toothed, sawblade-like "coleodiform" S elements at the front of the jaw, followed by two pairs of smaller "archeognathiform" P elements with large teeth. The S elements are indistinguishable from those of many species of Coleodus, a wastebasket taxon of Ordovician conodonts. This strongly suggests that most specimens referred to Coleodus actually belong to Archeognathus.

References 

Enigmatic prehistoric animal genera
Ordovician animals
Fossil taxa described in 1938